The following are the national records in track cycling in United Arab Emirates, maintained by its national cycling federation, U.A.E. Cycling Federation.

Men

Women

References

United Arab Emirates
records
track cycling
track cycling